Brigadier-General Paul Triquet  (April 2, 1910–August 8, 1980), born in Cabano, Quebec, was a Canadian recipient of the Victoria Cross (VC), the highest and most prestigious award for gallantry in the face of the enemy that can be awarded to British and Commonwealth forces. Triquet held the rank of captain at the time of his VC award, and went on to achieve the rank of brigadier-general.

Triquet was the only Quebecer to be awarded the VC during the Second World War.

Details

Paul Triquet was a 33-year-old captain in the Royal 22e Régiment (R22eR), Royal Canadian Infantry Corps, during the Second World War when the following deed took place as part of the Moro River Campaign in Italy.

His VC citation reads: On 14 December 1943 during the attack on Casa Berardi, Italy, when all the other officers and half the men of his company had been killed or wounded, Captain Triquet dashed forward and, with the remaining men, broke through the enemy resistance. He then forced his way on with his small force – now reduced to two sergeants and 15 men – into a position on the outskirts of Casa Berardi. They held out against attacks from overwhelming numbers until the remainder of the battalion relieved them, the next day. Throughout the action Captain Triquet's utter disregard for danger and his cheerful encouragement were an inspiration to his men.

Memorials
A memorial plaque was placed at Mount Royal Crematorium, Montreal, Quebec, Canada. His ashes are interred in the regimental memorial of the R22eR, Citadelle of Quebec. Triquet Island, (51°47′60″ N, 128°15′0″ W), is named in his honour and is located off the west coast of British Columbia. A statue of Triquet stands in the centre of Ottawa as part of the fourteen Valiants in Confederation Square.

Mont Triquet is one of the peaks in the training area of CFB Valcartier.

Medals

His medals can be seen at the Citadelle, but the displayed VC is actually a replica of Triquet's.

References

Monuments to Courage (David Harvey, 1999)
The Register of the Victoria Cross (This England, 1997)

External links

 Drawing and biography of Paul Triquet
 Biography with photo

Canadian World War II recipients of the Victoria Cross
1910 births
1980 deaths
People from Bas-Saint-Laurent
Chevaliers of the Légion d'honneur
French Quebecers
Canadian generals
Knights of the Order of St John
Canadian Army personnel of World War II
Royal 22nd Regiment officers
Canadian military personnel from Quebec